This is a list of television series produced, distributed or owned by Lionsgate Television, including Artisan Entertainment, Vestron Television, Trimark Pictures, Debmar-Mercury, Pilgrim Media Group, Creative Differences Productions, Hearst Entertainment, Tribune Entertainment, and Starz.

Lionsgate Television

Debmar-Mercury

Pilgrim Media Group

Creative Differences Productions
Note: Formerly known as Termite Arts Productions.
Amazing Science (1998)
Too Extreme (1999)
Incredible Vacation Videos (1999–2002)
Speed Demons (1999)
30 Roller Coasters in 24 Hours? (2001)
Amazing Animal Videos (2001–02)
Amazing Baby Videos (2002–04)
What Were You Thinking? (2002–04)
Love University (2003)
More than Human (2003–04)

Vestron Television
Dirty Dancing (1988–89) (co-production with The Steve Tisch Company)

Trimark Pictures
Thunder in Paradise (1994) (co-production with Berk/Schwartz/Bonann Productions and Rysher Entertainment)

Hearst Entertainment
Some King Features/Hearst Entertainment programs (primarily their animated series) are owned by Hearst Communications.

Tribune Entertainment

Starz Entertainment

Starz Distribution
(Note: formerly known as IDT Entertainment and Starz Media)
Masters of Horror (2005–07)
Eloise: The Animated Series (2006)
Wow! Wow! Wubbzy! (2006–10)
Eon Kid (2007–08)
Hit the Floor (2013–18) (produced by The Film Syndicate and In Cahoots Media)

Film Roman
(Note: Starz no longer owns the Film Roman studio. However, it still owns most of the company's library)
Garfield and Friends (1988–94)
Bobby's World (1990–98)
Zazoo U (1990–91)
Mother Goose and Grimm (1991–93)
Animated Classic Showcase (1993–94)
Cro (1993–94)
Mighty Max (1993–94)
The Baby Huey Show (1995)
The Mask: Animated Series (1995–97; now owned by Warner Bros. Television Studios)
The Twisted Tales of Felix the Cat (1995–97)
C Bear and Jamal (1996–97)
Mortal Kombat: Defenders of the Realm (1996; now owned by Warner Bros. Television Studios)
Bruno the Kid (1996–97)
The Mr. Potato Head Show (1998)
Tripping the Rift (2004–07)
Dan Vs. (2011–13)

References

Notes

Lionsgate